The following elections were occurred in the year 2013.

Asia
 2013 Armenian local elections 26 May, 17 November, and 8 December 2013
 2013 Armenian presidential election 18 February 2013
 2013 Bangladeshi presidential election 22 April 2013
 2013 Iranian local elections 14 June 2013
 2013 Iranian presidential election 14 June 2013
 2013 Iraqi governorate elections 20 April 2013
 2013 Israeli legislative election 22 January 2013
 2013 Israeli municipal elections 22 October 2013
 2013 Kuwaiti general election 27 July 2013
 2013 Maldivian presidential election 9 and 16 November 2013
 2013 Mongolian presidential election 26 June 2013
 2013 Nepalese Constituent Assembly election 19 November 2013
 2013 Northern Cyprus parliamentary election 28 July 2013
 2013 Jordanian parliamentary election 23 January 2013
 2013 Pakistani general election 11 May 2013
 2013 Pakistani presidential election 30 July 2013
 2013 Cambodian general election 28 July 2013
 2013 Macanese legislative election 15 September 2013
 2013 Azerbaijani presidential election 9 October 2013
 2013 Tajikistani presidential election 6 November 2013
 2013 Turkmenistani parliamentary election 15 December 2013
 2013 Bhutanese National Assembly election 31 May and 13 July 2013
 2013 Bhutanese National Council election 23 April 2013
 2013 Malaysian general election 5 May 2013
 2013 Singaporean by-election 26 January 2013
 2013 Japanese House of Councillors election 21 July 2013

Philippines
 2013 Philippine general election 13 May 2013
 2013 Philippine barangay elections 28 October 2013

Africa
 2013 Djiboutian parliamentary election 22 February 2013
 2013 Kenyan general election 4 March 2013
 2013 Malagasy general election 25 October and 20 December 2013
 2013 Guinean legislative election 28 September 2013
 2013 Cameroonian parliamentary election 30 September 2013
 2013 Zimbabwean general election 31 July 2013
 2013 Malian parliamentary election 24 November 2013
 2013 Malian presidential election 28 July and 11 August 2013
 2013 Togolese parliamentary election 25 July 2013
 2013 Rwandan parliamentary election 16–18 September 2013
 2013 Equatorial Guinean legislative election 26 May 2013
 2013 Saint Helena general election 17 July 2013

Europe
 2013 Papal conclave 12 March 2013
 2013 Austrian legislative election 29 September 2013
 2013 German federal election 22 September 2013
 2013 Bulgarian parliamentary election 12 May 2013
 2013 Italian general election 24–25 February 2013
 2013 Maltese general election 9 March 2013
 2013 Norwegian parliamentary election 8–9 September 2013
 2013 Liechtenstein parliamentary election 1 and 3 February 2013
 2013 Cypriot presidential election 17 and 24 February 2013
 2013 Armenian presidential election 18 February 2013
 2013 Montenegrin presidential election 7 April 2013
 2013 Icelandic parliamentary election 27 April 2013
 2013 Albanian parliamentary election 23 June 2013
 2013 Georgian presidential election 27 October 2013
 2013 Portuguese local election 29 September 2013

North America

Canada
 2013 British Columbia general election 14 May 2013

United States
 2013 Los Angeles mayoral election 5 March and 21 May 2013
 2013 New York City mayoral election 5 November 2013

Central and South America
2013 Argentine legislative election 27 October 2013
2013 Chilean general election 17 November and 15 December 2013
2013 Honduran general election 24 November 2013
2013 Falkland Islands general election 7 November 2013
2013 Falkland Islands sovereignty referendum 10–11 March 2013
2013 Paraguayan general election 21 April 2013
2013 Venezuelan presidential election 14 April 2013

Oceania

Australia

Federal
 2013 Australian federal election 7 September 2013

Northern Territory
 2013 Wanguri by-election 16 February 2013

Victoria
 2013 Lyndhurst state by-election 27 April 2013

Western Australia
 2013 Western Australian state election 9 March 2013

New Zealand
 2013 New Zealand local elections 12 October 2013
 2013 Auckland local elections 20 September to 12 October 2013
 2013 Christchurch mayoral election 12 October 2013
 2013 Dunedin mayoral election 12 October 2013
 2013 Hamilton mayoral election 12 October 2013
 2013 Wellington City mayoral election 12 October 2013
 2013 Christchurch East by-election 30 November 2013
 2013 New Zealand asset sales referendum 22 November to 13 December 2013

Nauru
 2013 Nauruan presidential election 11 June 2013

See also

 
2013
Elections